Nevertheless, often abbreviated as NTL, was a Christian power pop band from Chattanooga, Tennessee. Their song, "Live Like We're Alive", reached the top 5 of the R&R Christian Rock Chart. Their song "The Real," was played on contemporary Christian music radio stations, peaking in the Top 10 on radio stations throughout the United States. The band has toured with many other contemporaries from the Christian rock scene, including The Click Five, The All American Rejects, The Downtown Fiction, Hawk Nelson, The Classic Crime, Anberlin, Parachute and Lifehouse. 

They disbanded after a concert in December 2009. They made this decision due to personal life and pressure.

Band name
The band's name is derived from Luke 5:5 (New King James Version), the disciples were fishing and Jesus told them to cast their net at the other side of the boat,
 But Simon answered and said to Him, "Master, we have toiled all night and caught nothing; nevertheless at Your word I will let down the net."

Band members

Current
Josh Pearson - lead vocals, acoustic guitar
AJ Cheek - guitar, backing vocals, keyboards
Adam Wann - bass
Adam Rowe - drums

Former
Brad Jones - guitar, backing vocals
Chris Campbell- drums 
Zack Randolph - guitar (fill-in)

Post-breakup
Following the breakup of Nevertheless, several of the members have gone on to play in other bands and work on other projects.
In 2010, lead guitarist AJ Cheek went on to play with Australian band Revive as a touring guitarist and keyboards before joining them fully as a band. Since then he has also released his own EP, The Art of Letting Go, which was released on December 7, 2010.

Lead singer, Joshua Pearson, is also currently working on a solo music project of his own for release in the future.

Discography
2005: From The Inside Looking In - EP – (independent)
2006: Live Like We're Alive (major label debut)
2008: In the Making...
2009: When I'm With You - EP (independent)

References

External links
 

Christian rock groups from Tennessee
Flicker Records artists
Musical groups established in 2003